The economy of South Korea is a highly developed mixed economy. By nominal GDP, it has the 4th largest economy in Asia and the 13th largest in the world. South Korea is notable for its rapid economic development from an underdeveloped nation to a developed, high-income country in a few generations. This economic growth has been described as the Miracle on the Han River, which has allowed it to join OECD and the G-20. South Korea remains one of the fastest-growing developed countries in the world following the Great Recession and the COVID-19 recession. It is included in the group of Next Eleven countries as having the potential to play a dominant role in the global economy by the middle of the 21st century.

South Korea's education system and the establishment of a motivated and educated populace was largely responsible for spurring the country's high technology boom and economic development. South Korea began to adapt an export-oriented economic strategy to fuel its economy. In 2019, South Korea was the eighth largest exporter and eighth largest importer in the world. The Bank of Korea and the Korea Development Institute periodically release major economic indicators and economic trends of the economy of South Korea.

Renowned financial organizations, such as the International Monetary Fund, notes the resilience of the South Korean economy against various economic crises. They cite the country's economic advantages as reasons for this resilience, including low state debt, and high fiscal reserves that can quickly be mobilized to address any expected financial emergencies. Other financial organizations, like the World Bank, describe Korea as one of the fastest-growing major economies of the next generation, along with BRIC and Indonesia. South Korea was one of the few developed countries that was able to avoid a recession during the Great Recession. Its economic growth rate reached 6.2% in 2010, a recovery from economic growth rates of 2.3% in 2008 and 0.2% in 2009, during the Great Recession. The South Korean economy again recovered with the record-surplus of US$70.7 billion mark of the current account in the end of 2013, up 47 percent growth from 2012. This growth contrasted with the uncertainties of the global economic turmoil, with the country's major economic output being the technology products exports.

Despite the South Korean economy's high growth and structural stability, South Korea experiences damages to its credit rating in the stock market due to North Korea in times of military crises. The recurring conflict affects the financial markets of its economy.

History

Overview
Following the Korean War, South Korea remained a country with less developed markets for a little more than a decade. The growth of the industrial sector was the principal stimulus to South Korea's economic development. In 1986, manufacturing industries accounted for approximately 30 percent of the gross domestic product (GDP) and 25 percent of the work force. Due to strong domestic encouragement and some foreign aid, Seoul's industrialists introduced modern technologies into outmoded or newly built facilities, increased the production of commodities—especially those for sale in foreign markets—and plowed the proceeds back into further industrial expansion. As a result, industry altered South Korea's landscape, drawing millions of labourers to urban manufacturing centres.

A downturn in the South Korean economy in 1989 spurred by a decrease in exports and foreign orders caused concern in the industrial sector. Ministry of Trade and Industry analysts stated that decreased export performance resulted from structural problems, including an overly strong won, increased wages and labor costs, frequent strikes, and higher interest rates. The result was an increase in inventories and cutbacks in production at a number of electronics, automobile, and textile manufacturers, as well as at the smaller firms that supplied the parts. Factory automation systems were introduced to reduce dependence on labour, to boost productivity with a smaller work force, and to improve competitiveness.

Rapid growth from 1960s to 1980s

With the coup of General Park Chung-hee in 1961, which at first caused political instability and an economic crisis, a protectionist economic policy began, pushing a bourgeoisie that developed in the shadow of the State to reactivate the internal market. To promote development, a policy of export-oriented industrialization was applied, closing the entry into the country of all kinds of foreign products, except raw materials. Agrarian reforms were carried out and General Park nationalized the financial system to swell the powerful state arm, whose intervention in the economy was through five-year plans.

The spearhead was the chaebols, those diversified family conglomerates such as Hyundai, Samsung and LG Corporation, which received state incentives such as tax breaks, legality for their exploitation system and cheap or free financing: the state bank facilitated the planning of concentrated loans by item according to each five-year plan, and by economic group selected to lead it.

South Korea received donations from the United States due to the Cold War, and foreign economic and military support continued for some years. Chaebols started to dominate the domestic economy and, eventually, began to become internationally competitive. Under chaebols, workers began to see their wages and working conditions improve, which increased domestic consumption. By the 1980s, the country rose from low income to middle income.

South Korea's real GDP expanded by an average of more than 8 percent per year, from US$2.7 billion in 1962 to US$230 billion in 1989, breaking the trillion dollar mark in the early 2000s. Nominal GDP per capita grew from $103.88 in 1962 to $5,438.24 in 1989, reaching the $20,000 milestone in 2006. The manufacturing sector grew from 14.3 percent of the GNP in 1962 to 30.3 percent in 1987. Commodity trade volume rose from US$480 million in 1962 to a projected US$127.9 billion in 1990. The ratio of domestic savings to GNP grew from 3.3 percent in 1962 to 35.8 percent in 1989. In the early 1960s, South Korea's rate of growth exceeded North Korea's rate of growth in most industrial areas. 

The most significant factor in rapid industrialization was the adoption of an outward-looking strategy in the early 1960s. This strategy was particularly well-suited to that time because of South Korea's low savings rate and small domestic market. The strategy promoted economic growth through labor-intensive manufactured exports, in which South Korea could develop a competitive advantage. Government initiatives played an important role in this process. Through the model of export-led industrialization, the South Korean government incentivized corporations to develop new technology and upgrade productive efficiency to compete the global market. By adhering to state regulations and demands, firms were awarded subsidization and investment support to develop their export markets in the evolving international arena. In addition, the inflow of foreign capital was encouraged to supplement the shortage of domestic savings. These efforts enabled South Korea to achieve growth in exports and subsequent increases in income.

By emphasizing the industrial sector, Seoul's export-oriented development strategy left the rural sector barely touched. The steel and shipbuilding industries in particular played key roles in developing South Korea's economy during this time. Except for mining, most industries were located in the urban areas of the northwest and southeast. Heavy industries were located in the south of the country. Factories in Seoul contributed over 25 percent of all manufacturing value-added in 1978; taken together with factories in surrounding Gyeonggi Province, factories in the Seoul area produced 46 percent of all manufacturing that year. Factories in Seoul and Gyeonggi Province employed 48 percent of the nation's 2.1 million factory workers. Increased income disparity between the industrial and agricultural sectors became a problem by the 1970s despite government efforts to raise farm income and improve rural areas 

In the early 1980s, in order to control inflation, a conservative monetary policy and tight fiscal measures were adopted. Growth of the money supply was reduced from the 30 percent level of the 1970s to 15 percent. During this time, Seoul froze its budget for a short while. Government intervention in the economy was greatly reduced and policies on imports and foreign investment were liberalized to promote competition. To reduce the imbalance between rural and urban sectors, Seoul expanded investments in public projects, such as roads and communications facilities, while further promoting farm mechanization.

The measures implemented early in the decade, coupled with significant improvements in the world economy, helped the South Korea regain its lost momentum. South Korea achieved an average of 9.2 percent real growth between 1982 and 1987 and 12.5 percent between 1986 and 1988. The double-digit inflation of the 1970s was brought under control. Wholesale price inflation averaged 2.1 percent per year from 1980 through 1988; consumer prices increased by an average of 4.7 percent annually. Seoul achieved its first significant surplus in its balance of payments in 1986 and recorded a US$7.7 billion and a US$11.4 billion surplus in 1987 and 1988 respectively. This development permitted South Korea to begin reducing its level of foreign debt. The trade surplus for 1989, however, was only US$4.6 billion, and a small negative balance was projected for 1990.

1990s and the Asian Financial Crisis

For the first half of the 1990s, the South Korean economy continued a stable and strong growth in both private consumption and GDP. During the 1997 Asian financial crisis, after several other Asian currencies were attacked by speculators, the Korean won started to depreciate in October 1997. The problem was exacerbated due to non-performing loans at many of Korea's merchant banks. By December 1997, the IMF had approved a US$21 billion loan, that would be part of a US$58.4 billion bailout plan. By January 1998, the government had shut down a third of Korea's merchant banks. Throughout 1998, Korea's economy would continue to shrink quarterly at an average rate of −6.65%. and South Korean chaebol Daewoo was dismantled by the government in 1999 due to debt problems. American company General Motors managed to purchase the motors division. Indian conglomerate Tata Group, purchased the trucks and heavy vehicles division of Daewoo.

Actions by the South Korean government and debt swaps by international lenders contained the country's financial problems. Much of South Korea's recovery from the 1997 Asian financial crisis can be attributed to labor adjustments (i.e. a dynamic and productive labor market with flexible wage rates) and alternative funding sources. By the first quarter of 1999, GDP growth had risen to 5.4%, and strong growth thereafter combined with deflationary pressure on the currency led to a yearly growth of 10.5%. In December 1999, president Kim Dae-jung declared the currency crisis over.

2000s
Korea's economy moved away from the centrally planned, government-directed investment model toward a more market-oriented one. These economic reforms, pushed by President Kim Dae-jung, helped Korea maintain one of Asia's few expanding economies , with growth rates of 10.8% in 1999 and 9.2% in 2000. Growth fell back to 3.3% in 2001 because of the slowing global economy, decreased exports, and perceptions that corporate and financial reforms have stalled.

After the bounce back from the 1997 Asian financial crisis, the economy continued strong growth in 2000 with a GDP growth of 9.08%. However, the South Korean economy was affected by the September 11 Attacks. The slowing global economy, falling exports, and the perception that corporate and financial reforms had stalled caused growth to decrease to 3.8% in 2001 Thanks to industrialization GDP per hour worked (labor output) more than tripled from US$2.80 in 1963 to US$10.00 in 1989. More recently the economy stabilized and maintain a growth rate between 4–5% from 2003 onwards.

Led by industry and construction, growth in 2002 was 5.8%, despite anemic global growth. The restructuring of Korean conglomerates (chaebols), bank privatization, and the creation of a more liberalized economy—with a mechanism for bankrupt firms to exit the market—remain an unfinished reform task. Growth slows down in 2003, but production expanded 5% in 2006, due to popular demand for key export products such as HDTVs and mobile phones.

Like most industrialized economies, South Korea experienced setbacks during the Great Recession. Growth fell by 3.4% in the fourth quarter of 2008 from the previous quarter, the first negative quarterly growth in 10 years, with year on year quarterly growth continuing to be negative into 2009. Many sectors of the economy at the time reported declines, with manufacturing dropping 25.6% as of January 2009, and consumer goods sales dropping 3.1%. Exports in autos and semiconductors, two pillars of the economy, shrank 55.9% and 46.9% respectively, while exports overall fell by a record 33.8% in January, and 18.3% in February 2009 year on year. As in the 1997 Asian financial crisis, Korean currency also experienced massive fluctuations, declining by 34% against the US dollar. Annual growth in the economy slowed to 2.3% in 2008, and was expected to drop to as low as −4.5% by Goldman Sachs, but South Korea was able to limit the downturn to a standstill at 0.2% in 2009. Despite the Great Recession, the South Korean economy, helped by timely stimulus measures and strong domestic consumption of products that compensated for decreased exports, was able to avoid a recession unlike most industrialized economies, posting positive economic growth for two consecutive years of the crisis. In 2010, South Korea made an economic rebound with a growth rate of 6.1%, signaling a return of the economy to pre-crisis levels. South Korea's export has recorded $424 billion in the first eleven months of the year 2010, already higher than its export in the whole year of 2008. The South Korean economy of the 21st century, as a Next Eleven economy, is expected to grow from 3.9% to 4.2% annually between 2011 and 2030, similar to growth rates of developing countries such as Brazil or Russia.

The South Korean government signed the Korea-Australia Free Trade Agreement (KAFTA) on 5 December 2013, with the Australian government seeking to benefit its industries—including automotive, services, and resources and energy—and position itself alongside competitors, such as the US and ASEAN. South Korea is Australia's third largest export market and fourth largest trading partner with a 2012 trade value of A$32 billion. The agreement contains an Investor State Dispute Settlement (ISDS) clause that permits legal action from South Korean corporations against the Australian government if their trade rights are infringed upon.

The government cut the work week from six days to five in phases, from 2004 to 2011, depending on the size of the firm. The number of public holidays was expanded to 16 by 2013.

South Korean economy decreased in the first quarter of 2019, which happened to be its worst drop since the Great Recession. GDP declined a seasonally adjusted 0.3 percent from the previous quarter.

South Korea’s prices rose more than 6 percent in July compared with last year, the fastest jump in nearly a quarter century.

In July 2022, South Korea’s Consumer Price Index rose 6.3 percent, the highest rate since November 1998.

High-tech industries in the 1990s and 2000s
In 1990, South Korean manufacturers planned a shift in future production plans toward high-technology industries. In June 1989, panels of government officials, scholars, and business leaders held planning sessions on the production of such goods as new materials, mechatronics—including industrial robotics—bioengineering, microelectronics, fine chemistry, and aerospace. This shift in emphasis, however, did not mean an immediate decline in heavy industries such as automobile and ship production, which had dominated the economy in the 1980s.

South Korea relies upon exports to fuel the growth of its economy, with finished products such as electronics, textiles, ships, automobiles, and steel being some of its most important exports. Although the import market has liberalized in recent years, the agricultural market has remained protectionist due to disparities in the price of domestic agricultural products such as rice with the international market. As of 2005, the price of rice in South Korea was four times that of the average price of rice on the international market, and it was believed that opening the agricultural market would affect South Korean agricultural sector negatively. In late 2004, however, an agreement was reached with the WTO in which South Korean rice imports will gradually increase from 4% to 8% of consumption by 2014. In addition, up to 30% of imported rice will be made available directly to consumers by 2010, where previously imported rice was only used for processed foods. Following 2014, the South Korean rice market will be fully opened.

South Korea today is known as a Launchpad of a mature mobile market, where developers thrive in a market where few technology constraints exist. There is a growing trend of inventions of new types of media or apps, using the 4G and 5G internet infrastructure in South Korea. South Korea has today the infrastructures to meet a density of population and culture that has the capability to create strong local particularity.

Data 
The following table shows the main economic indicators in 1980–2021 (with IMF staff stimtates in 2022–2027). Inflation below 5% is in green.

Sectors

Shipbuilding
During the 1970s and 1980s, South Korea became a leading producer of ships, including oil supertankers, and oil-drilling platforms. The country's major shipbuilder was Hyundai, which built a 1-million-ton capacity drydock at Ulsan in the mid-1970s. Daewoo joined the shipbuilding industry in 1980 and finished a 1.2-million-ton facility at Okpo on Geoje Island, south of Busan, in mid-1981. The industry declined in the mid-1980s because of the oil glut and because of a worldwide recession. There was a sharp decrease in new orders in the late 1980s; new orders for 1988 totaled 3 million gross tons valued at US$1.9 billion, decreases from the previous year of 17.8 percent and 4.4 percent, respectively. These declines were caused by labor unrest, Seoul's unwillingness to provide financial assistance, and Tokyo's new low-interest export financing in support of Japanese shipbuilders. However, the South Korean shipping industry was expected to expand in the early 1990s because older ships in world fleets needed replacing. South Korea eventually became the world's dominant shipbuilder with a 50.6% share of the global shipbuilding market as of 2008. Notable Korean shipbuilders are Hyundai Heavy Industries, Samsung Heavy Industries, Daewoo Shipbuilding & Marine Engineering, and the now bankrupt STX Offshore & Shipbuilding.

Electronics
Electronics is one of South Korea's main industries. During the 1980s through the 2000s, South Korean companies such as Samsung, LG and SK led South Korea's growth in this sector. In 2017, 17.1% of South Korea's exports were semiconductors produced by Samsung Electronics and SK Hynix. Samsung and LG are also major producers in electronic devices such as televisions, smartphones, display, and computers.

Automobile

The automobile industry was one of South Korea's major growth and export industries in the 1980s. By the late 1980s, the capacity of the South Korean motor industry had increased more than fivefold since 1984; it exceeded 1 million units in 1988. Total investment in car and car-component manufacturing was over US$3 billion in 1989. Total production (including buses and trucks) for 1988 totaled 1.1 million units, a 10.6 percent increase over 1987, and grew to an estimated 1.3 million vehicles (predominantly passenger cars) in 1989. Almost 263,000 passenger cars were produced in 1985—a figure that grew to approximately 846,000 units in 1989. In 1988 automobile exports totaled 576,134 units, of which 480,119 units (83.3 percent) were sent to the United States. Throughout most of the late 1980s, much of the growth of South Korea's automobile industry was the result of a surge in exports; 1989 exports, however, declined 28.5 percent from 1988. This decline reflected sluggish car sales to the United States, especially at the less expensive end of the market, and labor strife at home. South Korea today has developed into one of the world's largest automobile producers. The Hyundai Kia Automotive Group is South Korea's largest automaker in terms of revenue, production units and worldwide presence.

Mining

Most of the mineral deposits in the Korean Peninsula are located in North Korea, with the South only possessing an abundance of tungsten and graphite. Coal, iron ore, and molybdenum are found in South Korea, but not in large quantities and mining operations are on a small scale. Much of South Korea's minerals and ore are imported from other countries. Most South Korean coal is anthracite that is only used for heating homes and boilers.

In 2019, South Korea was the 3rd largest world producer of bismuth, the 4th largest world producer of rhenium, and the 10th largest world producer of sulfur.

Construction

Construction has been an important South Korean export industry since the early 1960s and remains a critical source of foreign currency and invisible export earnings. By 1981 overseas construction projects, most of them in the Middle East, accounted for 60 percent of the work undertaken by South Korean construction companies. Contracts that year were valued at US$13.7 billion. In 1988, however, overseas construction contracts totaled only US$2.6 billion (orders from the Middle East were US$1.2 billion), a 1 percent increase over the previous year, while new orders for domestic construction projects totaled US$13.8 billion, an 8.8 percent increase over 1987.  South Korean construction companies therefore concentrated on the rapidly growing domestic market in the late 1980s. By 1989 there were signs of a revival of the overseas construction market: the Dong Ah Construction Company signed a US$5.3 billion contract with Libya to build the second phase (and other subsequent phases) of Libya's Great Man-Made River Project, with a projected cost of US$27 billion when all 5 phases were completed. South Korean construction companies signed over US$7 billion of overseas contracts in 1989. Korea's largest construction companies include Samsung C&T Corporation, which built some of the highest building's and most noteworthy skyscrapers such as three consecutively world's tallest buildings: Petronas Towers, Taipei 101, and Burj Khalifa.

Armaments

During the 1960s, South Korea was dependent on the United States to supply its armed forces, but after the elaboration of President Richard M. Nixon's policy of Vietnamization in the early 1970s, South Korea began to manufacture its own weapons.

Since the 1980s, South Korea has begun exporting military equipment and technology to boost its international trade. Some of its key military export projects include the T-155 Firtina self-propelled artillery for Turkey; the K11 air-burst rifle for United Arab Emirates; the Bangabandhu class guided-missile frigate for Bangladesh; fleet tankers such as Sirius class for the navies of Australia, New Zealand, and Venezuela; Makassar class amphibious assault ships for Indonesia; and the KT-1 trainer aircraft for Turkey, Indonesia and Peru.

South Korea also exports various core components of other countries' advanced military hardware. Those hardware include modern aircraft such as F-15K fighters and AH-64 attack helicopters which will be used by Singapore, whose airframes will be built by Korea Aerospace Industries in a joint-production deal with Boeing. In other major outsourcing and joint-production deals, South Korea has jointly produced the S-300 air defense system of Russia via Samsung Group, and will facilitate the sales of Mistral class amphibious assault ships to Russia that will be produced by STX Corporation. The deal was cancelled in 2014 due to Russia's actions in Ukraine and the ships were sold to Egypt instead. South Korea's defense exports were $1.03 billion in 2008 and $1.17 billion in 2009.

Tourism

In 2012, 11.1 million foreign tourists visited South Korea, making it one of the most visited countries in the world, up from 8.5 million in 2010. Many tourists from all around Asia visit South Korea which has been due to the rise of Korean Wave (Hallyu).

Seoul is the principal tourist destination for visitors; popular tourist destinations outside of Seoul include Seorak-san national park, the historic city of Gyeongju and semi-tropical Jeju Island.
In 2014 South Korea hosted the League of Legends season 4 championship and then, in 2018, the season 8 championship.

Trade statistics

Mergers and acquisitions 
Since 1991 there has been a steady upwards trend in South Korean M&A until 2018 with only a short break around 2004. Since 1991 around 18,300 deals in, into or out of South Korea have been announced, which sum up to a total value of over 941. bil. USD. The year 2016 has been the year with the largest deal value (1,818 in bil. USD) and the most deals (82,3).

Target industries are distributed very evenly with no industry taking a larger share than 10%. The top three target industries are Electronics (9.7%), Semiconductors (9.1%) and Metals and Mining (7.7%). However, over 51% of the acquiring companies originate from the financial and brokerage sector.

See also

Economy of North Korea
List of banks in South Korea
List of companies of South Korea
List of largest companies of South Korea
List of South Korean regions by GDP
Poverty in South Korea
Retailing in South Korea
Unemployment in South Korea
Trade unions in South Korea
Work–life balance in South Korea
Youth unemployment in South Korea

References

Further reading
Koh, Jae Myong (2018) Green Infrastructure Financing: Institutional Investors, PPPs and Bankable Projects, London: Palgrave Macmillan. .

 Essays on such topics as American-educated technocrats in the 1960s and their role in South Korea's economic growth, and entrepreneurial family companies in South Korea, as well as China and Japan.

External links

 
Statistics Korea 
Ministry of Economy and Finance (South Korea)
Korea Customs Service
Bank Of Korea 
World Bank Summary Trade Statistics South Korea
South Korea – OECD
South Korea profile at the CIA World Factbook 
South Korea profile at The World Bank 
 

Economy of South Korea
World Trade Organization member economies
OECD member economies